John Williamson (25 August 1815 – 16 February 1875) was a New Zealand politician, printer and newspaper proprietor. He was a leading opponent of the 1860s wars against Māori and lost his newspaper and fortune as a result.

Early life
Williamson was probably born on 25 August 1815, or possibly February 1815, in Newry, County Down, Ireland. He served his apprenticeship as a printer.  He married in either 1833 or 1834 to Sarah Barre, and they were to have five children. They emigrated to Sydney in 1840, where he worked for The Australasian Chronicle and then The Sydney Monitor. He moved to Auckland, New Zealand, in mid-1841.

New Zealand

He purchased his own printing press in 1845 and started the New Zealander, which became Auckland's leading newspaper. The editorial approach of the New Zealander, was to support the ordinary settler and the Māori.

He was joined by partner W.C. Wilson in 1848, until Wilson left to found The New Zealand Herald in 1863. The New Zealander ceased after a fire on 7 May 1866. A coroner's hearing concluded there was insufficient information to determine the cause, though evidence was given of an unknown person running away. In 1867 the Evening Post wrote, "It was a combination of leading men in Auckland - notably the business men - that killed the New Zealander, causing heavy loss to its actual proprietor and those conducting it. Why? It ventured to have an opinion, and to maintain it."

He was a member of the Auckland Provincial Council in the first council from 22 July 1853, representing the Pensioner Settlements electorate. He served until 15 November 1856 as a councillor. He was, over three periods, the fourth Superintendent of Auckland Province (1856–1862 resigned; 1867–1869 defeated; 1873–1875 died). On 28 December 1865, he became a member of the Auckland Executive Council as commissioner of waste lands under Frederick Whitaker as Superintendent, until he succeeded him in 1867 following his resignation.

Williamson represented the Pensioner Settlements (consisting of the Auckland suburbs of Howick, Onehunga, Otahuhu, and Panmure) in the 2nd New Zealand Parliament from 1855 to 1860, and represented the City of Auckland West electorate in the 3rd Parliament, the 4th Parliament, and the 5th Parliament from 1861 to 1875 (in 1871 the election was declared void, but he was then re-elected).

He was briefly a minister without portfolio in the second Fox Ministry in July/August 1861. He died in 1875, while he was a Member of Parliament. He was buried in Symonds Street Cemetery.

Notes

References

External links 
 1861 election results by polling place

1815 births
1875 deaths
Members of the New Zealand House of Representatives
Members of the Auckland Provincial Council
Superintendents of New Zealand provincial councils
Members of the Cabinet of New Zealand
Irish emigrants to New Zealand (before 1923)
Members of Auckland provincial executive councils
People from Newry
New Zealand MPs for Auckland electorates
19th-century New Zealand politicians
Burials at Symonds Street Cemetery